Javokhir Sidikov (born 8 December 1996) is an Uzbek football midfielder who plays for Lokomotiv Tashkent in Uzbek League and the Uzbekistan national football team.

International career

International goals
Scores and results list Uzbekistan's goal tally first.

References

1996 births
Living people
Association football midfielders
Uzbekistani footballers
Uzbekistan youth international footballers
Uzbekistan international footballers
Pakhtakor Tashkent FK players
PFC Lokomotiv Tashkent players
Uzbekistan Super League players
Footballers at the 2018 Asian Games
2019 AFC Asian Cup players
Asian Games competitors for Uzbekistan